Kreft's dichromaticity index (DI) is a measure for quantification of dichromatism. It is defined as the difference in hue angle (Δhab) between the color of the sample at the dilution, where the chroma (color saturation) is maximal, and the color of four times more diluted (or thinner) and four times more concentrated (or thicker) sample. The two hue angle differences are called the dichromaticity index towards lighter (Kreft's DIL) and
dichromaticity index towards darker (Kreft's DID) respectively. Kreft's dichromaticity indexes DIL and DID  for pumpkin seed oil, which is one of the most dichromatic substances, are −9 and −44, respectively. This means, that pumpkin seed oil changes its color from green-yellow to orange-red (for 44 degrees in Lab color space) when the thickness of the observed layer is increased from cca 0.5 mm to 2 mm; and it changes slightly towards green (for 9 degrees) if its thickness is reduced for four-fold.

The color of pumpkin oil at increasing thickness or concentration presented in CIELAB colorspace diagram. Straight lines are vectors showing hue (angle) and chroma (length) of the color at maximal chroma (toward the square mark), and the colors of four-fold less or more diluted or thick pumpkin oil (DIL and DID). Note that DID is −44.1 degrees and DIL corresponds to −8.97 degrees.

Dichromaticity (DIL and DID) of selected substances, calculated from their VIS absorption spectra by the computer algorithm “Dichromaticity index calculator”:

Maximal chroma: chroma at concentration (thickness) where the color of the substance has maximal chroma (saturation). Angle at maximal chroma: the hue, which is represented by the angle of the vector to the color with maximal chroma in the CIELAB colorspace diagram.

References

External links 
 Free Dichromaticity Index Calculator software

Optics
Color
Index numbers
Scales
Spectroscopy